The 2015 Girls' Youth Pan-American Volleyball Cup played by eight countries from March 17–22, 2015 in Habana, Cuba.

Competing Nations

Squads

Preliminary round

Group A

Group B

Final round

Championship bracket

5th–8th places bracket

Quarterfinals

Classification 5/8

Semifinals

Seventh place match

Fifth place match

Bronze medal match

Final

Final standing

Individual awards

Most Valuable Player
 
Best Setter
 
Best Opposite
 
Best Outside Hitters
 
 
Best Middle Blockers
 
 
Best Libero
 
Best Scorer
 
Best Server

References

External links

Women's Pan-American Volleyball Cup
Youth Pan-American Volleyball Cup
Girls Youth Pan American Volleyball Cup
Volleyball